Anzac Parade can refer to: 
 Anzac Parade, Canberra
 Anzac Parade, Sydney
 Anzac Day parades for war veterans held on Anzac Day.